"Freed from Desire" is a eurodance song written and recorded by Italian singer and songwriter Gala. It was released in 1997 as the first single from her debut album, Come into My Life (1997). It was a hit in many European countries, reaching number-one in France and Belgium. The track was released in the UK in July 1997, peaking at number two and spending eight weeks inside the top 10 and 14 weeks in total in the top 75. Gala achieved a diamond recording certification in France, a double-platinum certification in Belgium and the United Kingdom, and a gold certification in Italy.

The song was written and composed by Gala, and produced by Filippo Andrea Carmeni and Maurizio Molella, two Italian producers.

Critical reception
In a list of "The Top 10 Dance Tunes of the '90s" for Attitude in 2016, "Freed from Desire" was ranked at number three. Melody Maker complimented its "driller-killer Europop irresistibility". A reviewer from Music Week gave the song four out of five, writing, "A chart topper across Europe, this has similar appeal to Crystal Waters' "Gypsy Woman". That reached number two and, with the right exposure, this could, too." Pop Rescue called it a "great" song, noting "the handclaps, the beats, drum fills, whirling synths and that bassline, and of course that catchy 'ner ner ner ner-ner ner her' section." They added it as "a fine specimen" of "90s dance". Dave Fawbert from ShortList described it as an "absolute, total banger", and "a song that the Beatles would have been proud to have written."

Chart performance
"Freed from Desire" went on to become a huge hit all over Europe, becoming the singer's most successful single. It peaked at number-one in Belgium (in both Flanders and Wallonia) and France, and entered the top 10 also in Denmark (7), Iceland (9), Ireland (2), Italy (2), the Netherlands (5), Scotland (3), and the United Kingdom. In the latter, the song reached number two on the UK Singles Chart on August 3, 1997. It spent 8 weeks inside the top 10 and 14 weeks in total in the top 75, while peaking at number four on the UK Dance Singles Chart in the same period. On the Eurochart Hot 100, "Freed from Desire" also peaked within the top 10, reaching its best position as number four in December 1996. Additionally, it was a top 20 hit in Austria (16), Finland (17), Germany (14) and Switzerland (13).

The single was awarded a diamond recording certification in France, a double-platinum certification in Belgium and the United Kingdom, and a gold certification in Italy.

Music video
The accompanying music video for "Freed from Desire" was filmed in Hamburg at the Speicherstadt under the direction of German director and photographer Nina Bittel. It was shot in a sepia tone filter while Gala is chased around by several different men. Other scenes features the singer driving an 1962 Austin-Healey 3000.

Usage in association football
The song has been used as a football chant by fans of Bohemian FC as far back as April 2011, where at a game away to Sligo Rovers it was sung with the lyrics amended to "The Bohs have got no money, we've got a bag of E's."  (Ecstasy) Reference was made to the chant in the Irish Independent at the time, who wrote "For 45 minutes the visiting fans -- who clearly planned around dry Good Friday -- roared out 1990s dance classic 'Freed From Desire' seemingly oblivious to their team being dismantled on the park" and was recorded by Sligo Rovers fans in the opposite stand. 

The chorus was used for a football chant in 2012 by Stevenage F.C. fans for winger Luke Freeman as: "Freeman's on fire, your right back is terrified!" Following that, in early 2016, Newcastle United supporters adapted the song for their striker Aleksandar Mitrović, the refrain being: "Mitro's on fire, your defence is terrified", which has also been used by fans of Fulham FC after his transfer there. However, Mitrović suffered poor form; the chant went viral in May of that year, as Wigan Athletic supporter Sean Kennedy uploaded on YouTube his version of "Freed from Desire" titled "Will Grigg's on Fire", in recognition of the recent goal-scoring feats of Will Grigg, a Wigan player. This version was recorded by dance producers Blonde under the alias DJ Kenno, and it reached No. 76 on the UK single chart. The version kept the exciting music and introduced exciting words:

Grigg is on fire, your defense is terrified...

Grigg will score just more and more...

Fans from Northern Ireland also sang "Will Grigg's on Fire", notably during UEFA Euro 2016, as he played for Northern Ireland. Fans of Ireland, Wales, England, and France made their own versions of the song for their players, such as "Vardy's on Fire" and "Grizi's on Fire". It was later seen as the unofficial song of UEFA Euro 2016.  "Freed from Desire" itself was used as the unofficial anthem for the Belgian team during the 2018 FIFA World Cup.

From January 2022, "Freed from Desire" was chosen via a fan poll as the post-match victory song of Melbourne Victory FC; the song will be played over AAMI Park's loudspeakers after every Melbourne Victory home win.

France, England, Switzerland and Poland's national football associations chose Freed from Desire to be played as their goal music at the 2022 FIFA World Cup.

The song has also been adapted by A.C. Milan fans into the chant "Pioli Is On Fire", in tribute to current manager Stefano Pioli.

Gala herself has expressed support for the use of the song as a sports anthem, stating that "it’s such a beautiful thing that a song has an energy by itself":

Other versions
In 2016, Gala recorded an acoustic version of "Freed from Desire" at Les Studios Saint Germain in Paris, for the movie Un homme à la hauteur directed by Laurent Tirard with Jean Dujardin.

Track listings

Charts

Weekly charts

Year-end charts

Certifications and sales

Drenchill and Indiiana version

In 2018, Drenchill released a cover of "Freed from Desire". It reached number 1 in Poland and number 4 in the Commonwealth of Independent States.

Charts

Weekly charts

Year-end charts

Certifications

See also
List of number-one singles of 1996 (France)
Ultratop 40 number-one hits of 1996
Ultratop 50 number-one hits of 1997
Will Grigg

References

1996 songs
1996 singles
1997 singles
Gala (singer) songs
SNEP Top Singles number-one singles
Ultratop 50 Singles (Flanders) number-one singles
Ultratop 50 Singles (Wallonia) number-one singles
Football songs and chants
ZYX Music singles